Bagh Dasht (also Romanized as Bāgh Dasht, Bagh-e Dasht, and Bāgh-i-Dash; also known as Bāgh Dāsh) is a village in Jereh Rural District, Jereh and Baladeh District, Kazerun County, Fars Province, Iran. At the 2006 census, its population was 979, in 195 families.

References 

Populated places in Kazerun County